Saint George and the Dragon or Saint George Killing the Dragon is a 1555 or 1558 painting by the Venetian artist Tintoretto. It was acquired by the English collector William Holwell Carr, who bequeathed it to the National Gallery, where it now hangs.

The slaying of the dragon by Saint George was a popular motif for early painters. The legend relates how the city of Silene in Libya was being terrorised by a dragon and the townspeople eventually forced to provide it with a supply of victims chosen by lot.  On the occasion portrayed in the picture the King's daughter had been chosen and sent to her death dressed  as a bride. By chance Saint George arrived on horseback and killed or wounded the beast with his lance, allowing the princess to escape.

Tintoretto's composition is unusual in that the viewer's eye is drawn to the foreground figure of the escaping princess with her bright pink cloak or to the bright heavenly light in the sky giving divine blessing for the deed. St George himself,  in the very act of spearing the dragon, is consigned to the background. in the middleground lies the dead body of a previous victim, lying  as if crucified, possibly a warning that his death would be avenged.

See also
 Saint George and the Dragon - history of the legend of Saint George.
Saint George and the Dragon (disambiguation) - other paintings based on the legend

References 

This article is partly  based on the equivalent article at :it:San Giorgio uccide il drago (Tintoretto)  in Italian Wikipedia. See that article for attribution.

External links
Image on Google Art

1588 paintings
Paintings by Tintoretto
Collections of the National Gallery, London
Religious paintings
Horses in art
Paintings of dragons
Saint George and the Dragon